Keith Hughes may refer to:
Keith F. Hughes (1936–2021), American lawyer and politician
Keith Hughes (baseball) (born 1963), American outfielder for the New York Yankees
Keith Hughes (basketball) (1968–2014), basketball player
Keith Hughes (historian) (born 1972), American historian, educator, and host of HipHughes History